Reliability of semiconductor devices can be summarized as follows:
 Semiconductor devices are very sensitive to impurities and particles. Therefore, to manufacture these devices it is necessary to manage many processes while accurately controlling the level of impurities and particles. The finished product quality depends upon the many layered relationship of each interacting substance in the semiconductor, including metallization, chip material (list of semiconductor materials) and package.
 The problems of micro-processes, and thin films and must be fully understood as they apply to metallization and wire bonding. It is also necessary to analyze surface phenomena from the aspect of thin films.
 Due to the rapid advances in technology, many new devices are developed using new materials and processes, and design calendar time is limited due to non-recurring engineering constraints, plus time to market concerns. Consequently, it is not possible to base new designs on the reliability of existing devices.
 To achieve economy of scale, semiconductor products are manufactured in high volume. Furthermore, repair of finished semiconductor products is impractical. Therefore, incorporation of reliability at the design stage and reduction of variation in the production stage have become essential.
 Reliability of semiconductor devices may depend on assembly, use, environmental, and cooling conditions. Stress factors affecting device reliability include gas, dust, contamination, voltage, current density, temperature, humidity, mechanical stress, vibration, shock, radiation, pressure, and intensity of magnetic and electrical fields.
Design factors affecting semiconductor reliability include: voltage, power, and current derating; metastability; logic timing margins (logic simulation); timing analysis; temperature derating; and process control.

Methods of improvement 
Reliability of semiconductors is kept high through several methods. Cleanrooms control impurities,
process control controls processing, and burn-in (short term operation at extremes) and probe and test reduce escapes. Probe (wafer prober) tests the semiconductor die, prior to packaging, via micro-probes connected to test equipment. Final test tests the packaged device, often pre-, and post burn-in for a set of parameters that assure operation. Process and design weaknesses are identified by applying a set of stress tests in the qualification phase of the semiconductors before their market introduction e. g. according to the AEC Q100 and Q101 stress qualifications. Parts Average Testing is a statistical method for recognizing and quarantining semiconductor die that have a higher probability of reliability failures. This technique identifies characteristics that are within specification but outside of a normal distribution for that population as at-risk outliers not suitable for high reliability applications. Tester-based Parts Average Testing varieties include Parametric Parts Average Testing (P-PAT) and Geographical Parts Average Testing (G-PAT), among others. Inline Parts Average Testing (I-PAT) uses data from production process control inspection and metrology to perform the outlier recognition function.

Bond strength measurement is performed in two basic types: pull testing and shear testing. Both can be done destructively, which is more common, or non destructively. Non destructive tests are normally used when extreme reliability is required such as in military or aerospace applications.

Failure mechanisms 
Failure mechanisms of electronic semiconductor devices fall in the following categories
 Material-interaction-induced mechanisms.
 Stress-induced mechanisms.
 Mechanically induced failure mechanisms.
 Environmentally induced failure mechanisms.

Material-interaction-induced mechanisms 
 Field-effect transistor gate-metal sinking
 Ohmic contact degradation
 Channel degradation
 Surface-state effects
 Package molding contamination—impurities in packaging compounds cause electrical failure

Stress-induced failure mechanisms 
 Electromigration – electrically induced movement of the materials in the chip
 Burnout – localized overstress 
 Hot Electron Trapping – due to overdrive in power RF circuits
 Electrical Stress – Electrostatic discharge, High Electro-Magnetic Fields (HIRF), Latch-up overvoltage, overcurrent

Mechanically induced failure mechanisms 
 Die fracture – due to mis-match of thermal expansion coefficients
 Die-attach voids – manufacturing defect—screenable with Scanning Acoustic Microscopy.
 Solder joint failure by creep fatigue or intermetallics cracks.
 Die-pad/molding compound delamination due to thermal cycling

Environmentally induced failure mechanisms 
 Humidity effects – moisture absorption by the package and circuit
 Hydrogen effects – Hydrogen induced breakdown of portions of the circuit (Metal)
 Other Temperature Effects—Accelerated Aging, Increased Electro-migration with temperature, Increased Burn-Out

See also
 Transistor aging
 Failure analysis
 Cleanroom
 Burn-in
 List of materials-testing resources
 List of materials analysis methods

References

Bibliography 
 
 
 MIL-HDBK-217F Reliability Prediction of Electronic Equipment
 MIL-HDBK-251 Reliability/Design Thermal Applications 
 MIL-HDBK-H 108 Sampling Procedures and Tables for Life and Reliability Testing (Based on Exponential Distribution)
 MIL-HDBK-338 Electronic Reliability Design Handbook
 MIL-HDBK-344 Environmental Stress Screening of Electronic Equipment
 MIL-STD-690C Failure Rate Sampling Plans and Procedures
 MIL-STD-721C Definition of Terms for Reliability and Maintainability
 MIL-STD-756B Reliability Modeling and Prediction
 MIL-HDBK-781 Reliability Test Methods, Plans and Environments for Engineering Development, Qualification and Production
 MIL-STD-1543B Reliability Program Requirements for Space and Missile Systems
 MIL-STD-1629A Procedures for Performing a Failure Mode, Effects, and Criticality Analysis
 MIL-STD-1686B Electrostatic Discharge Control Program for Protection of Electrical and Electronic Parts, Assemblies and Equipment (Excluding Electrically Initiated Explosive Devices)
 MIL-STD-2074 Failure Classification for Reliability Testing
 MIL-STD-2164 Environment Stress Screening Process for Electronic Equipment
 
 
 
 
 

Semiconductor device fabrication